Francisco Israel Rivera Dávalos (born 23 September 1994) is a Mexican professional footballer who plays as a midfielder for KF Llapi.

Honours
América
CONCACAF Champions League: 2014–15, 2015–16

KF Llapi
Kosovar Supercup: 2021

References

External links

1994 births
Living people
Mexican expatriate footballers
Club América footballers
C.D. Veracruz footballers
Alebrijes de Oaxaca players
Mineros de Zacatecas players
Monagas S.C. players
Atlante F.C. footballers
Querétaro F.C. footballers
Liga MX players
Ascenso MX players
Liga Premier de México players
Venezuelan Primera División players
Footballers from San Luis Potosí
People from San Luis Potosí City
Association football midfielders
Expatriate footballers in Venezuela
Mexican expatriate sportspeople in Venezuela
Mexican expatriate sportspeople in Kosovo
Expatriate footballers in Kosovo
Mexican footballers